Eleutherodactylus leberi is a species of frog in the family Eleutherodactylidae, endemic to Cuba. Its natural habitat is closed mesic forest, including wet limestone forest.
It is threatened by habitat loss.

References

leberi
Endemic fauna of Cuba
Amphibians of Cuba
Amphibians described in 1965
Taxonomy articles created by Polbot